Luc Bessala (born 21 September 1985) is a Cameroonian former professional footballer who played as a defender.

References
 
 

1985 births
Living people
Cameroonian footballers
Association football defenders
Deportes Temuco footballers
C.D. Arturo Fernández Vial footballers
Provincial Osorno footballers
Tiro Federal footballers
Primera B de Chile players
Cameroonian expatriate footballers
Cameroonian expatriate sportspeople in Chile
Expatriate footballers in Chile
Cameroonian expatriate sportspeople in Argentina
Expatriate footballers in Argentina
Cameroonian expatriate sportspeople in Venezuela
Expatriate footballers in Venezuela